The Madwoman in the Volvo is a 2016 play written by Sandra Tsing Loh, it was adapted from Loh's 2014 book The Madwoman in the Volvo: My Year of Raging Hormones.

Loh adapted The Madwoman in the Volvo into a play for South Coast Repertory Theater.

Overview
A three-character stage adaptation of mid-life madness, all started by an unlikely trip to Burning Man.

References

American plays
2016 plays
Plays based on books
Asian-American plays
Comedy plays